Samson Samuel Opuakpo Forcados is professional swimmer in Nigeria who competes internationally for his country and a backstroke and freestyle swimmer. He currently holds the top backstroke and distance freestyler record in Nigeria.

His last result was

The swimming competitions at the 2016 Summer Olympics in Rio de Janeiro took place from 6 to 13 August at the Olympic Aquatics Stadium.

Major Results

Individual

Long course

Short course

Relay

Long course

References
2.    ^ (PDF)(PDF). Retrieved 2011-07-24

3   ^ . Retrieved 29 July 2011

4.    ^ (PDF)(PDF). Retrieved 2011-07-25

5.    ^ (PDF)(PDF). Retrieved 2011-07-25

1986 births
Living people
Nigerian male swimmers
People from Delta State
Male backstroke swimmers
Nigerian male freestyle swimmers
Swimmers at the 2016 Summer Olympics
Olympic swimmers of Nigeria
Competitors at the 2011 All-Africa Games
Swimmers at the 2015 African Games
African Games competitors for Nigeria